Hierodoris huia is a species of moth in the family Oecophoridae. It is endemic to New Zealand. It is only known from two sites in Titirangi that are approximately 1 to 2 km apart. H. huia is suspected to be a forest canopy-dweller. This species is on the wing in January. Although the adult moths are attracted to light it has been hypothesised that it is a diurnal species on the basis of the behaviour the species exhibit when light trapped. The species was named in honour of the extinct bird species, the huia, as well as the type locality of Huia Road, Titirangi.  This species is classified as "Data Deficient" by the Department of Conservation.

Taxonomy and etymology 
This species was first described by Robert R. J. Hoare in 2005. The species was first discovered by C. R. Thomas in January 1953. The holotype specimen was collected at Titirangi by P. A. Maddison on 28 January 1980. The holotype specimen is held at the New Zealand Arthropod Collection. Prior to its formal scientific description this species was referred to as Coridomorpha 'long palpi'. The epithet is in honour the extinct bird species, the huia, as well as the type locality of Huia Road, Titirangi.

Description
H. huia can be identified by the minute segment 3 of the labial palp, the white subapical patch on the antenna and the metallic patches of curled scales on the forewing. These features are all unique to this species. This species is also sexually dimorphic with the female of the species having much longer labial palpi than the male.

Distribution 

This species is endemic to New Zealand. It is only known from two sites in Titirangi that are approximately 1 to 2 km apart.

Biology and behaviour 
Little is known of the biology of this species. Larvae have yet to be discovered. This species is on the wing in January. Although the adult moths are attracted to light it has been hypothesised that they are a diurnal species on the basis of their behaviour when light trapped.

Host species and habitat 
The host species for the larvae of this moth is currently unknown. Both sites where this species has been found are close to forest habitat. H. huia is suspected to be a forest canopy-dweller.

Conservation Status 
This species has been classified as having the "Data Deficient" conservation status under the New Zealand Threat Classification System.

References

Moths described in 2005
Moths of New Zealand
Oecophoridae
Endemic fauna of New Zealand
Taxa named by Robert Hoare
Endemic moths of New Zealand